David Couper Thomson DL (6 August 1861  – 12 October 1954) was a Newspaper proprietor and founder of the newspaper and publishing company D. C. Thomson & Co. Ltd in Dundee, Scotland. He was the son of William Thomson, shipowner (18 June 1817 – unknown) and his wife, Margaret Couper. He was raised in Newport-on-Tay, Fife 
and was later sent to the family shipping business in Glasgow.

His father, William Thomson, was a successful draper and later a shipowner, and in 1884 became the major shareholder of the Dundee Courier & Daily Argus. In 1886, at his father's request, David Couper Thomson moved back to Dundee to become the general manager of the paper. The other son, Frederick Thomson (1864–1917), joined the company in 1888.

DC Thomson was founded with £60,000 capital. William, David and Frederick had all but four of the company shares which were valued at £10 per share. Each wife had an allocation of one share; the remaining share belonged to Frances Thomas Mudie.

When Frederick died in 1917, D.C. became the sole proprietor of the company. Between 1920 and 1922, he actively campaigned using vitriolic rhetoric against one of the two M.P.s for Dundee, then Liberal politician Winston Churchill. At one meeting, Churchill was able to speak for only 40 minutes when he was barracked by a section of the audience. At the General Election of 1922 both of the local newspapers owned by Thomson, the Liberal supporting "Dundee Advertiser" and the Conservative inclined "Courier" advised their readers to reject Churchill. Subsequently, Churchill came only fourth in the poll and lost his seat at Dundee to prohibitionist, Edwin Scrymgeour, quipping later that he left Dundee "without an office, without a seat, without a party and without an appendix". Thomson barred Churchill's name from his newspapers until World War II made occasional use of it unavoidable.

During the General Strike of 1926, most employees of his publishing concern were members of National Society of Operative Printers and Assistants (Natsopa). David Coupar Thomson was outraged by the strike and the effect it had on his business. Earlier in 1926, his company took over the rival company John Leng & Co. which produced the "Dundee Advertiser". The strike coincided with the merger. After the strike, Natsopa members were allowed to return provided the members signed a document to say that they had left the union and tender an apology. In March 1952, a strike was caused when a man who had worked for the company since 1921 was discovered to have secretly joined Natsopa in 1939.

Although Thomson was less involved with the company after 1933, he remained chairman of the company until his death, aged 93, in 1954; but it was his nephew, Harold, who drove the expansion of its publishing interests, particularly in the field of comics. The Sunday Post, launched in 1914, introduced a "Fun" section in 1936 which became home to iconic cartoon characters such as Oor Wullie and The Broons. The Dandy — which included Desperate Dan — first appeared in the following year, and The Beano eight months later, offering a free "Whoopee Mask" with its first issue.

Private life

D.C. Thomson married Margaret McCulloch (d.1952) and had a daughter, Irene Elma Couper Ingemann Thomson (1900–1979), and son, Conrad Gerald Couper (1903–1918).

David was Deputy Lieutenant of Dundee for 50 years, Governor of University College, Dundee for nearly 60 years and was also an active member of Dundee Chamber of Commerce and Dundee Eye Institute.

He died on 12 October 1954 and is buried in the Western Cemetery, Dundee. The grave lies against the western wall flanked by his shipowner forebearers.

His brother, the shipowner William Thomson (1860–1925) married Clara Beatrice Leng, daughter of the publisher Sir John Leng.

His brother Frederick Thomson (1864–1917) was a shipowner and newspaper proprietor, running the Dundee Courier. David took on this role after Frederick's death.

References

See also
List of DC Thomson Publications
British comics

1861 births
1954 deaths
People educated at the High School of Dundee
20th-century British newspaper publishers (people)
British newspaper chain founders
People from Newport-on-Tay
20th-century Scottish newspaper publishers (people)
People from Dundee
Deputy Lieutenants of Dundee
Journalists from Dundee
Businesspeople from Dundee
People associated with the University of Dundee